Beth Fowler is an American actress and singer, best known for her performances on Broadway and for her role as Sister Ingalls, on Orange Is the New Black. She is a two-time Tony Award nominee.

Life and career
Born in Jersey City, New Jersey, Fowler attended Caldwell University in New Jersey and was a music teacher for several years, as well as performing in community theater. 
 Fowler attended Catholic schools and planned to enter a convent before becoming a music teacher.

She had a fondness for Broadway theatre when she decided to audition for Gantry in 1970. She was signed for the chorus and as understudy for the lead, but the show closed on opening night. She had better luck with her next outing, Stephen Sondheim's A Little Night Music. Additional Broadway credits include 1600 Pennsylvania Avenue; Peter Pan; Baby; Take Me Along; Teddy & Alice; the 1989 revival of Sweeney Todd, in which she portrayed Mrs. Lovett; Beauty and the Beast, in which she originated the role of Mrs. Potts; Bells Are Ringing; and The Boy from Oz, where she portrayed Peter Allen's mother Marion.

Fowler has been nominated for two Tony Awards: as Best Featured Actress in a Musical for The Boy From Oz and as Best Actress in a Musical for Sweeney Todd, which garnered her a Drama Desk Award nomination as well.

During her career, Fowler appeared in a number of films, including Sister Act and Sister Act 2: Back in the Habit, Friends & Family, Did You Hear About the Morgans?, I Don't Know How She Does It, and Mulan, in which she sang "Honor to Us All". On television, Fowler guest-starred on Law & Order, Law & Order: Criminal Intent,  Ed, and Gossip Girl. In 2013, she began appearing in the recurring role as Sister Jane Ingalls in the comedy-drama series Orange Is the New Black. Along with cast, Fowler received the Screen Actors Guild Award for Outstanding Performance by an Ensemble in a Comedy Series.

Personal
Since 2000, Fowler has been a resident of New Milford, New Jersey, having previously resided in Rutherford, Teaneck, Hawthorne, and Glen Rock.

Fowler married Jack Witham in 1976.

Filmography

References

External links
 
 
 

American musical theatre actresses
American women singers
20th-century American actresses
Living people
People from Hawthorne, New Jersey
Actresses from Jersey City, New Jersey
People from New Milford, New Jersey
People from Rutherford, New Jersey
People from Teaneck, New Jersey
Singers from New Jersey
American television actresses
American film actresses
21st-century American actresses
Musicians from Jersey City, New Jersey
Caldwell University alumni
Year of birth missing (living people)